The 1996 Broadland District Council election took place on 2 May 1996 to elect members of Broadland District Council in England. This was on the same day as other local elections.

Election result

References

1996 English local elections
May 1996 events in the United Kingdom
1996
1990s in Norfolk